There are 84 kilometres of railway in Sierra Leone, all of which is private and of a narrow gauge, .

Network
Sierra Leone no longer has any common carrier railroads, as the  gauge Sierra Leone Government Railway from Freetown through Bo to Kenema and Daru with a branch to Makeni closed in 1974. The country does not share rail links with adjacent countries, Guinea and Liberia.

The existing railway between the port of Pepel and the Marampa iron ore mine is being refurbished by African Minerals plc. This is a common carrier railway, but will be used predominantly for transporting iron ore.  African Minerals is also constructing a new standard gauge railway from the Tonkolili iron ore mine to a new port at Tagrin Point.

See also
 Railway stations in Sierra Leone
 Transport in Sierra Leone

References

Notes

Bibliography

External links

 Interactive map of Sierra Leone railway system

 
3 ft 6 in gauge railways in Sierra Leone